Islamia is a genus of small freshwater snails with a gill and an operculum, aquatic gastropod mollusks in the family Hydrobiidae.

Species 
Species within the genus Islamia include:
 
 Islamia adelmuellerae A. Reischütz, Steiner-Reischütz & P. L. Reischütz, 2018
 † Islamia amiatae Esu & Girotti, 2015 
Islamia anatolica Radoman, 1973
Islamia archeducis Boeters & Beckmann, 2007
 † Islamia ateni (Boeters, 1969)
 Islamia ayalga Ruiz-Cobo, Alonso, Quiñonero-Salgado & Rolán, 2018
 † Islamia bambolii Esu & Girotti, 2015 
 Islamia bendidis Reischütz, 1988
Islamia bomangiana Boeters & Falkner, 2003
Islamia bosniaca Radoman, 1973
Islamia bourguignati (T. Letourneux, 1869)
 Islamia burdurica Yıldırım, Çağlan Kaya, Gürlek & Koca, 2017
Islamia bunarbasa (Schütt, 1964)
Islamia cianensis Bodon, Manganelli, Sparacio & Giusti, 1995
 † Islamia corinthica Esu & Girotti, 2015 
Islamia coronadoi (Bourguignat, 1870) (uncertain)
Islamia dmitroviciana Boeters, Glöer & Pešić, 2013
Islamia edlingeri (A. Reischütz & P. L. Reischütz, 2004) (uncertain)
Islamia emanuelei Girardi, 2009
Islamia epirana (Schütt, 1962)
 Islamia gaillardoti (Germain, 1911)
Islamia gaiteri  Bodon, Manganelli, Sparacio & Giusti, 1995
Islamia germaini Boeters & Falkner, 2003
Islamia globulus (Bofill, 1909)
Islamia graeca Radoman, 1973
Islamia hadei (Gittenberger, 1982)
Islamia henrici Arconada & Ramos, 2006
 Islamia karawiyiensis Mabrouki, Glöer & Taybi, 2021
Islamia lagari (Altimira, 1960)
Islamia latina Radoman, 1973
Islamia mienisi (Schütt, 1991)
Islamia minuta (Draparnaud, 1805)
 Islamia montenegrina Glöer, Grego, Erőss & Fehér, 2015
Islamia moquiniana (Dupuy, 1851)
 Islamia mylonas Radea, Parmakelis, Demetropoulos & Vardinoyannis, 2017
Islamia pallida Arconada & Ramos, 2006
 Islamia papavasileioui Glöer & Reuselaars, 2020
Islamia piristoma Bodon & Cianfanelli, 2002
 Islamia pistrini Ruiz-Cobo, Alonso, Quiñonero-Salgado & Rolán, 2018
Islamia pseudorientalica Radoman, 1973
Islamia pusilla (Piersanti, 1951)
 Islamia ruffoi Bodon & Cianfanelli, 2012
† Islamia sarda Esu, 1984 
Islamia schuelei (Boeters, 1981)
 Islamia selensis Cianfanelli & Bodon, 2017
 Islamia skalaensis Glöer & Reuselaars, 2020
Islamia spirata (R. Bernasconi, 1985)
Islamia steffeki Glöer & Grego, 2015 
 Islamia tifertiensis Glöer, Mabrouki & Taybi, 2020
Islamia trichoniana Radoman, 1979
Islamia ucetiaensis Girardi & Boeters, 2015
Islamia valvataeformis (Möllendorff, 1873)
Islamia zermanica Radoman, 1973

 Species brought into synonymy
Islamia azarum (Boeters & Rolán, 1988): synonym of Deganta azarum (Boeters & Rolán, 1988) (new combination)
 Islamia burduricus Yıldırım, Çağlan Kaya, Gürlek & Koca, 2017: synonym of Islamia burdurica Yıldırım, Çağlan Kaya, Gürlek & Koca, 2017 (wrong gender agreement of specific epithet)
Islamia globulina (Paladilhe, 1866): synonym of Islamia moquiniana (Dupuy, 1851)

References

 Schütt, H. (1991). A contribution to the knowledge of some inland water hydrobiid snails in Israel (Gastropoda, Prosobranchia). Basteria, 55 (4/6): 129-137. Leiden

External links
 Radoman, P. (1973). New classification of fresh and brackish water Prosobranchia from the Balkans and Asia Minor. Prirodnjacki Muzej u Beogradu, Posebna Izdanja. 32: 3-30
  Arconada B. & Ramos M.A. (2006). Revision of the genus Islamia Radoman, 1973 (Gastropoda, Caenogastropoda, Hydrobiidae), on the Iberian peninsula and description of two new genera and three new species. Malacologia. 48(1-2): 77-132

 
Hydrobiidae